Dumitru Zastoico (born April 27, 1979) is a Moldovan former swimmer, who specialized in butterfly events. He is a 2000 Olympian, and a member of the Moldova swimming team. 

Zastoico competed only in two individual events at the 2000 Summer Olympics in Sydney. He achieved FINA B-standards of 56.21 (100 m butterfly) and 2:05.12 (200 m butterfly) from the Russian Open Championships in Saint Petersburg. In his first event, 200 m butterfly, Zastoico placed fifty-ninth on the morning prelims. Swimming in heat one, he picked up a fourth seed by 5.72 seconds behind winner Tseng Cheng-hua of Chinese Taipei in 2:09.34. Three days later, in the 100 m butterfly, Zastoico challenged seven other swimmers in heat three, including Kyrgyzstan's Konstantin Ushkov, silver medalist for Russia in Atlanta four years earlier, and Uzbekistan's top favorite Ravil Nachaev. He rounded out a field to last place and fifty-ninth overall by more than three seconds behind winner Nachaev in 58.55.

References

1979 births
Living people
Moldovan male butterfly swimmers
Olympic swimmers of Moldova
Swimmers at the 2000 Summer Olympics
Sportspeople from Bălți